Kami Cotler (born June 17, 1965) is an American actress and educator. She is best known for her role as young Elizabeth Walton, which she played in the series The Waltons, and the television film The Homecoming: A Christmas Story (1971) which inspired it, as well as a number of later Waltons reunion productions.

Biography
Cotler reduced her acting roles while she attended the University of California, Berkeley, earning a degree in Social Sciences.  Her first teaching job was at a small rural Virginia school in the Blue Ridge Mountains, much like the fictional one she attended on The Waltons. Cotler returned to California in 2001 and took a position teaching 9th grade at Environmental Charter High School. In 2004, Cotler accepted the job as co-director of the Ocean Charter School, a position held until 2007 when she started her own educational consulting business. She served as the founding Principal of Environmental Charter Middle School, an educational facility in southern Los Angeles County, California. Cotler is a past board member of the American Montessori Society.

In addition to working as an educator, Cotler ran her own boutique travel company and managed a San Francisco cafe. She has reprised her role as the youngest Walton child in each of the Waltons' reunion movies and she occasionally makes speeches and personal appearances. In 2010, Cotler was seen on a Waltons cast reunion and series retrospective that aired on cable network INSP. She is married and has two children.

Filmography

References

External links 
 
 Instagram

1965 births
Living people
20th-century American actresses
Actresses from Long Beach, California
American child actresses
American film actresses
American television actresses
Educators from California
American women educators
University of California, Berkeley alumni
21st-century American women
The Waltons